Christ Church in Armley, Leeds, West Yorkshire, England is an active Anglican parish church in the archdeaconry of Leeds and the Diocese of Leeds.  The church is one of two Church of England churches in Armley; the other being the larger St. Batholomew's Church. It is a Grade II listed building.

History

The church broke ground in 1869 before being completed in 1872, having been built to a design by architect Richard L. Adams.  The church was listed in 1976 and modernised internally in 1984.  In 1986 the church was included in the BBC's Domesday Project having its particulars recorded for posterity.  The question of the future viability of the church was recorded in the project.

Location
The church is located in Upper Armley on the junctions of Theaker Lane, Moorfield Road and Armley Ridge Road.  It is the closest of the Anglican churches to the centre of Armley.

Architectural style

The church is built of coursed square gritstone and has a pitched slate roof.  The church is built to a Gothic Revival style.  The church has a tall imposing nave with tripartite clerestory windows.

See also
List of places of worship in the City of Leeds
Listed buildings in Leeds (Armley Ward)

References

External links
Christ Church, Armley

Churches in Leeds
Grade II listed churches in Leeds
Anglican Diocese of Leeds
Church of England church buildings in West Yorkshire
Grade II listed churches in West Yorkshire
19th-century Church of England church buildings
Christ Church
Gothic Revival architecture in Leeds